Mick Mullane may refer to:
 Mick Mullane Jr. (born 1955), Australian rugby league player
 Mick Mullane Sr. (1924–2008), his father, Australian rugby league player
 Mick Mullane (hurler), Irish hurler

See also
 Mike Mullane, American engineer and astronaut